Paul V. Horcher (born August 31, 1951 in Texas) is an American former politician from California and a former member of the Republican Party.

Early career
A graduate of California State Polytechnic University, Pomona, Horcher practiced law before joining the Diamond Bar Municipal Advisory Council in 1982.  In 1989 he co-founded the city of Diamond Bar and was elected to its city council.

Legislative Races
In 1990 Horcher was elected to the California State Assembly from the 52nd district, which covered eastern Los Angeles County including the cities of West Covina, Whittier and Horcher's hometown of Diamond Bar.  He easily won reelection in the renumbered 60th district in 1992.

In early 1994 Horcher also ran, unsuccessfully this time, in a special election for the California State Senate. The 29th district had been vacated by the resignation of GOP incumbent Frank Hill, who had been convicted of corruption. Horcher came in third behind then GOP Assemblyman Dick Mountjoy and then Diamond Bar city councilman Gary Miller, with the mud between Mountjoy and Miller being especially nasty. Horcher did, however, have an easy reelection to the assembly later that November.

Assembly career
Although a Republican, Horcher carved a relatively moderate voting record while in the legislature.  His support on many key votes endeared him to Democratic Speaker Willie Brown but made him a pariah among his fellow Republicans.  After the 1994 elections, Republicans won control of the California State Assembly by a single seat.  Horcher, still fuming from his own party's rough treatment of him, declared himself an independent and voted to keep Democrat Brown in power.  Furious Republicans qualified a recall election against Horcher, which voters supported May 16, 1995, and replaced him with, coincidentally, Diamond Bar city councilman Gary Miller, who turned out to be a more loyal Republican.

Post Legislature
After leaving the Assembly, Horcher held various position in the administration of Willie Brown, who by then had been elected mayor of San Francisco.  He served under Brown from 1996 until 2004, when Brown's term ended. Following his service to San Francisco, he returned to a real estate and administrative law practice. His niche law practice in San Francisco includes representing massage parlors who have been accused of violating San Francisco Health Code.

Electoral history

References

External links
Join California Paul Horcher, Election History for the State of California

1951 births
Living people
Republican Party members of the California State Assembly
California Polytechnic State University alumni
People from Diamond Bar, California
20th-century American politicians